Diploastrea is a genus of corals. It is the only genus in the monotypic family Diploastreidae.

Species
The following species are recognized in the genus Diploastrea:
 Diploastrea heliopora (Lamarck, 1816)
 †Diploastrea polygonalis (Martin, 1880)

References

Scleractinia genera
Diploastreidae